Lee Sang-yup (born 2 October 1972) is a South Korean fencer. He competed in the épée events at the 1992, 2000 and 2004 Summer Olympics.

References

External links
 
 https://www.bb-fc.com/coaches-at-battle-born-fencing-club

1972 births
Living people
South Korean male épée fencers
Olympic fencers of South Korea
Fencers at the 1992 Summer Olympics
Fencers at the 2000 Summer Olympics
Fencers at the 2004 Summer Olympics
Sportspeople from Busan
Asian Games medalists in fencing
Fencers at the 1994 Asian Games
Fencers at the 1998 Asian Games
Fencers at the 2002 Asian Games
Asian Games gold medalists for South Korea
Asian Games bronze medalists for South Korea
Medalists at the 1994 Asian Games
Medalists at the 1998 Asian Games
Medalists at the 2002 Asian Games